James Hamlyn may refer to:

Sir James Hamlyn, 1st Baronet (1735-1811)
Sir James Hamlyn-Williams, 2nd Baronet (1765-1829)
Sir James Hamlyn-Williams, 3rd Baronet (1790-1861)

See also

Hamlyn (surname)